Melikşah University was a private university located in the Talas district of Kayseri Province, Turkey. Established in 2008, it was the second university established in Kayseri, and its first private university. It was named after Malik-Shah I (reigned between 1072 and 1092), a sultan of Seljuk Turks.

On 23 July 2016, Melikşah University, along with 14 other Turkish universities, was closed by a statutory decree under the state of emergency declared by the Turkish government following the 2016 Turkish coup d'état attempt. The government alleged the university had ties to the Gülenist which has been accused by Turkey of being behind the coup plot. The university's assets were seized and transferred to Erciyes University. At the time of its closure the university had an academic staff of 175 and 4500 students. Scholars at Risk has expressed concern at these mass closures, saying that they have a chilling effect on academic freedom, undermine democratic society, and may represent a grave threat to higher education in Turkey.

Academic units

Faculties 
 Faculty of Arts and Sciences
 Faculty of Law
 Faculty of Economics and Administrative Sciences
 Architectural and Engineering Faculty
 Faculty of Health Sciences

Institutes 
 Institute of Sciences

Education centers 
 Continuous Education, Application and Research Center

References

External links
 

Private universities and colleges in Turkey
Education in Kayseri
2008 establishments in Turkey
Educational institutions established in 2008
Educational institutions shut down in the 2016 Turkish purges
Defunct universities and colleges in Turkey